Myosin-XV is a protein that in humans is encoded by the MYO15A gene.

Gene 

Read-through transcript containing an upstream gene and this gene have been identified, but they are not thought to encode a fusion protein. Several alternatively spliced transcript variants have been described, but their full length sequences have not been determined.

Function 

This gene encodes an unconventional myosin. This protein differs from other myosins in that it has a long N-terminal extension preceding the conserved motor domain. Studies in mice suggest that this protein is necessary for actin organization in the hair cells of the cochlea.

Clinical significance 

Mutations in this gene have been associated with profound, congenital, neurosensory, nonsyndromic deafness. This gene is located within the Smith–Magenis syndrome region on chromosome 17.

References

Further reading